Lobelia thapsoidea is a tall herb that grows in elevated areas of Southeastern Brazil. As all other species in the subfamily Lobelioideae, it is poisonous and should be handled carefully.

External links
 Lobelia thapsoidea photo gallery

thapsoidea
Flora of Brazil